Rodniki is a rural locality (a khutor) in Strelnoshirokovskoye Rural Settlement, Dubovsky District, Volgograd Oblast, Russia. The population was 156 as of 2010. There are four streets.

Geography 
Rodniki is located on the right bank of the Volga River, 34 km northwest of Dubovka (the district's administrative centre) by road. Davydovka is the nearest rural locality.

References 

Rural localities in Dubovsky District, Volgograd Oblast